Handball competition of the 2018 South American Games in Cochabamba were held from May 27 to June 6 at the Coliseo Municipal Curubamba in the municipality of Sacaba, it qualified two places in both genders to the 2019 Pan American Games.

Participating teams

Men

Women

Medal summary

Men's tournament

Preliminary round

Group A

All times are local (UTC−04:00).

Group B

Consolation round

Knockout stage

Bracket

Semifinals

Bronze medal game

Gold medal game

Final standing

Women's tournament

Preliminary round

Group A

Group B

Consolation round

Knockout stage

Bracket

Semifinals

Bronze medal game

Gold medal game

Final standing

References

External links
 2018 South American Games – Handball 

2018 South American Games events
2018
South American Games
Qualification tournaments for the 2019 Pan American Games